Hondros is a 2017 American documentary film about the war photographer Chris Hondros. It was written by Greg Campbell and Jenny Golden, directed and produced by Campbell, and executive produced by Jake Gyllenhaal and Jamie Lee Curtis.

The film premiered on 21 April 2017 at Tribeca Film Festival, where it won the Audience Award, Documentary First Place. It had a limited theatrical release in the United States on 2 March 2018.

Hondros was killed in a mortar attack by government forces in Misrata while covering the 2011 Libyan civil war.

Film summary
The film is about the life and career of Hondros. It describes the stories behind some of his photographs.

Production
In 2013 Greg Campbell launched a Kickstarter campaign to produce a documentary then named Hondros: A Life in Frames. The project was launched with an initial goal of $30,000.00 and became fully funded within three days with a total of $89,639 raised.

Awards
Audience Award, Documentary First Place, Tribeca Film Festival, New York City

References

External links

2017 films
2017 documentary films
2010s biographical films
American biographical films
American documentary films
Bold Films films
Documentary films about war photographers
Entertainment Studios films
Films scored by Jeff Russo
Films set in Iraq
Films set in Libya
Films set in Liberia
Films set in the United States
2010s English-language films
2010s American films